Allan Percy Fleming  (5 March 191218 January 2001) was a senior Australian public servant and journalist, best known for his time as National Librarian in the 1970s.

Biography

Early life
Allan Fleming was born on 5 March 1912 in Melbourne, Victoria, Australia. He was educated at Lee Street State school in North Carlton, Scotch College and Melbourne University.

His first career was in journalism, first at the Melbourne Argus and later at the Brisbane Courier Mail.

World War II service
At the outbreak of World War II in 1939, Fleming enlisted in the Australian Imperial Force. He saw service in North Africa, Greece, New Guinea and the South-West Pacific, rising to the rank of Lieutenant-Colonel. After the war, he returned to journalism before joining the public sector.

Professional career
In 1968 Fleming was appointed Parliamentary Librarian. He became National Librarian in 1970, heading the National Library of Australia. In 1972 he went on a 10-week world tour studying libraries in Japan, Sweden, France, Belgium, the United States, the United Kingdom and Canada. Retiring in 1973, Fleming told media that he intended to write a book and spend time traveling in Europe.

later years
In 1976, returning from retirement, Fleming was appointed to head the Government Agency for Security of VIPs, responsible for coordinating security arrangements for the protection of visiting heads of state and other VIPs.

Fleming died on 18 January 2001.

Awards
Fleming was awarded as an Officer of the Order of the British Empire for distinguished military service in the South West Pacific. He was appointed a Commander of the Order of the British Empire in 1978, in recognition of his work in the Australian Public Service.

References

Further reading

1912 births
2001 deaths
Australian public servants
Australian Commanders of the Order of the British Empire
Australian librarians
Directors-General of the National Library of Australia